Tyendinaga is an alternate spelling of Thayendanegea, an eighteenth-century Mohawk chief also known as Joseph Brant.

Tyendinaga may also refer to:

 Tyendinaga Mohawk Territory, a First Nations reserve on the Bay of Quinte
 Mohawks of the Bay of Quinte First Nation, the First Nation government that governs that reserve
 Tyendinaga (Mohawk) Airport, located on that reserve
 Tyendinaga, Ontario, a township in Ontario